Đuro Kladarin (3 March 1915 - 1996) was a Croatian general. He served as President of the Chamber of Education and Culture of the Federal Assembly of Yugoslavia.

Biography
Kladarin was born in Luščani, Austria-Hungary on 3 March 1915. 

In 1941, Kladarin entered the National Liberation Army and Partisan Detachments of Yugoslavia. During the Second World War, he was a battalion commander and also the commander of the Yugoslavia Banijskega Troop.

In 1950, after World War Two, he graduated at the Higher Military Academy Army and then held high-ranking positions such as Brigade Commander and Division Chief of Staff. Đuro Kladarin officially retired from his political career circa 1965.

References

Yugoslav politicians
1915 births
1996 deaths
Croatian military personnel of World War II
Recipients of the Order of the People's Hero
Yugoslav military personnel